In 1971, the Pakistan Army and their local collaborators, most notably the extreme right wing militia group Al-Badr, engaged in the systematic execution of Bengali intellectuals during the Bangladesh Liberation War of 1971. Bengali intellectuals were abducted, tortured and killed during the entire duration of the war as part of the 1971 Bangladesh genocide. However, the largest number of systematic executions took place on 25 March and 14 December 1971, two dates that bookend the conflict. 14 December is commemorated in Bangladesh as Martyred Intellectuals Day.

Black Night of 25 March 

On 25 March 1971, Pakistan army launched an extermination campaign, codenamed Operation Searchlight, against the Bengali people in East Pakistan. A number of professors, physicians and journalists were abducted from their homes by armed Pakistani soldiers and their local collaborators, and executed during this operation and its aftermath.

14 December executions 

As the war neared its end and Pakistani surrender became apparent, the Pakistan Army made a final effort to eliminate the intelligentsia of the new nation of Bangladesh. On 14 December 1971, over 200 Bengali intellectuals including professors, journalists, doctors, artists, engineers, and writers were abducted from their homes in Dhaka by the Al-Badr militia and the Pakistan Army. Notable novelist Shahidullah Kaiser and playwright Munier Choudhury were among the victims. They were taken blindfolded to torture cells in Mirpur, Mohammadpur, Nakhalpara, Rajarbagh and other locations in different parts of the city. Later they were executed en masse, most notably at Rayerbazar and Mirpur. In memory of the martyred intellectuals, 14 December is mourned in Bangladesh as Shaheed Buddhijibi Dibosh, or Day of the Martyred Intellectuals.

It is widely speculated that the killings of 14 December were orchestrated by Major General Rao Farman Ali. After the liberation of Bangladesh a list of Bengali intellectuals (most of whom were executed on 14 December) was discovered in a page of his diary left behind at the Governor's House. The existence of such a list was confirmed by Ali himself although he denied the motive of genocide. The same was also confirmed by Altaf Gauhar, a former Pakistani bureaucrat. He mentioned an incident in which Gauhar asked Ali to remove a friend's name from the list and Ali did so in his presence.

Notable victims 
Many notable intellectuals who were killed from 25 March to 16 December 1971 in different parts of the country include:

 Dr. Abul Fazal Ziaur Rahman (physician)
 Dr. ABM Nurul Alam (physician)
 A. B. M. Abdur Rahim (labor union leader)
 Dr. AFM Alim Chowdhury (ophthalmologist)
 Ataur Rahman Khan Khadim (physicist)
 Dr. Atiqur Rahman (doctor)
 Dr. Azharul Haque (doctor)
 Dr. AKM Asadul Haq (doctor)
 Altaf Mahmud (lyricist and musician)
 ANM Golam Mostafa (journalist)
 ANM Muniruzzaman (statistician)
 Dr. Anwar Pasha (Bengali litterateur)
 Dr. Ayesha Bedora Choudhury
 Dhirendranath Datta (politician)
 Dr. Faizul Mahi (educator)
 Dr. Fazlur Rahman Khan (geologist)
 Dr. Govinda Chandra Dev (philosophy)
 Dr. Ghyasuddin Ahmed (educationist)
 Dr. Jyotirmoy Guhathakurta (English literature)
 Anudvaipayan Bhattacharya (lecturer of physics)
 Dr. Jekrul Haque (physician)
 Dr. Kalachand Roy (academic)
 Harinath Dey (biochemist, research scientist)
 Khondakar Abu Taleb (journalist)
 Khondakar Abul Kashem (historian)
 Meherun Nesa (poet)
 Munier Chowdhury (Bengali literature)
 Dr. Mufazzal Haider Chaudhury (Bengali literature)
 Muhammad Habibar Rahman (mathematician) 
 Dr. Mohammad Sadat Ali (business)
 Mohammad Shamshad Ali (physician)
 Muhammad Shafi (dentist)
Md Meher Ali (Soil Scientist)
 Dr. M Abul Khair (history)
 M Anwarul Azim (industrial administrator)
 Mir Abdul Qayyum (psychologist)
 Dr. Mohammed Fazle Rabbee (cardiologist)
 Dr. Mohammad Mortaza (doctor)
 Mohammad Moazzem Hossain (educationist)
 Mohammad Aminuddin (lawyer)
 Dr. Abdul Muktadir (geologist)
 Nizamuddin Ahmed (journalist)
 Nazmul Hoque Sarkar (lawyer)
 Dr. Rashidul Hasan (English literature)
 Ranadaprasad Saha (philanthropist)
 Dr. Rakhal Chandra Das (physician)
 Sukharanjan Samaddar (Sanskrit)
 Jogesh Chandra Ghosh (scholar, Ayurveda practitioner, entrepreneur and philanthropist)
 Shahid Saber (journalist)
 Sheikh Abdus Salam (education)
 Dr. Sirajul Haque Khan
 Dr. Santosh Chandra Bhattacharyya
 Dr. Shamsuddin Ahmed
 Laxman Das (wrestler, weight lifter, circus performer)
 Dr. Suleman Khan
 Sultanuddin Ahmed (engineer)
 Dr. Kosiruddin Talukder
 Shahidullah Kaiser (journalist)
 Selina Parvin (journalist)
 Bishnu Chattopadhyay (freedom fighter and leader of peasant movement)
 Saroj Kumar Nath Adhikari (economics)
 Sheikh Abdul Mannan (journalist)
 Dr. Shamsuddin Ahmed (physician)
 Syed Nazmul Haque (journalist)
 Obaidur Rahim (journalist)

Verdict on the killing 
On 3 November 2013, a Special Court in Dhaka has sentenced two former leaders of the al-Badr killing squad to death for war crimes committed in December 1971. Chowdhury Mueen-Uddin, based in London, and Ashrafuz Zaman Khan, based in the US, were sentenced in absentia after the court found that they were involved in the abduction and murders of 18 intellectuals – nine Dhaka University professors, six journalists and three physicians – in December 1971. Prosecutors said the killings were carried out between 10 and 15 December, when Pakistan was losing the war in Bangladesh (then East Pakistan), and were part of a campaign intended to strip the newborn nation of its intellectuals.

On 2 November 2014, International Crimes Tribunal, Bangladesh sentenced Mir Quasem Ali to death for war crimes which include the killings of intellectuals. It was proved in the tribunal that he was a key organiser of the Al-Badr, which planned and executed the killing of the intellectuals on 14 December 1971.

Statistics 
The number of intellectuals killed is estimated in Banglapedia as follows:
 Academics – 991
 Journalists – 13
 Physicians – 49
 Lawyers – 42
 Others (litterateurs, artists and engineers) – 16

The district wise break-up of the number of martyred academicians and lawyers published in 1972 was as follows –

{| class="wikitable"
! rowspan=2| District and division
! colspan=3| Academics
! rowspan=2| Lawyers
|-
! Primary
! Secondary
! Higher secondary
|-
| Dhaka
| 37
| 8
| 10
| 6
|-
| Faridpur
| 27
| 12
| 4
| 3
|-
| Tangail
| 20
| 7
| 2
|
|-
| Mymensingh
| 46
| 28
| 1
| 2
|-
! Dhaka Division
! 130
! 55
! 17
! 10
|-
| Chittagong
| 39
| 16
| 7
| 1
|-
| Chittagong Hill Tracts
| 9
| 4
| 1
| 1
|-
| Sylhet
| 19
| 7
|
| 2
|-
| Comilla
| 45
| 33
| 1
| 4
|-
| Noakhali
| 26
| 13
| 4
| 2
|-
! Chittagong Division
! 138
! 73
! 13
! 10
|-
| Khulna
| 48
| 15
| 2
| 2
|-
| Jessore
| 55
| 31
| 5
| 4
|-
| Barisal
| 50
| 21
| 4
|
|-
| Patuakhali
| 3
| 1
|
|
|-
| Kushtia
| 28
| 13
| 4
|
|-
! Khulna Division
! 184
! 81
! 15
! 6
|-
| Rajshahi
| 39
| 8
| 3
| 5
|-
| Rangpur
| 41
| 22
| 9
| 4
|-
| Dinajpur
| 50
| 10
| 1
| 2
|-
| Bogra
| 14
| 12
|
| 2
|-
| Pabna
| 43
| 9
| 1
| 2
|-
! Rajshahi Division
! 187
! 61
! 14
! 15
|-
! Bangladesh
! 639
! 270
! 59
! 41
|-
| colspan=5| Martyred academicians (not affiliated to universities) = 968
|-
| colspan=5| Martyred university teachers = 21
|-
| colspan=5| Total martyred academicians = 989
|}
Administrative districts and divisions mentioned here are as they were in 1972.

Denial of genocidal intent
In a 2018 article Christian Gerlach rejected the claims of coordinated attempt to exterminate the Bengali intelligentsia by using statistical measures: "if one accepts the data published by the Bangladesh propaganda ministry, 4.2 per cent of all university professors were killed, along with 1.4 per cent of all college teachers, 0.6 per cent of all secondary and primary school teachers, and 0.6 per cent of all teaching personnel. On the basis of the aforementioned Ministry of Education data, 1.2 per cent of all teaching personnel were killed. This is hardly proof of an extermination campaign."

Commemoration 

Martyred Intellectuals Day is held annually to commemorate the victims. In Dhaka, hundreds of thousands of people walk to Mirpur to lay flowers at the Martyred Intellectuals Memorial. The president and the prime minister of Bangladesh and heads of all three wings of the Bangladesh armed forces pay homage at the memorial.

See also 
 1971 Dhaka University massacre
 Katyn massacre
 Deportation of Armenian intellectuals on 24 April 1915

References 

Bangladesh Liberation War
Political and cultural purges
Mass murder in 1971
Massacres in Bangladesh
1971 in Bangladesh
University of Dhaka
War crimes in Bangladesh
1971 Bangladesh genocide
Anti-intellectualism
Pakistani war crimes
Pakistan military scandals
Persecution by Muslims
Persecution of intellectuals